Zatoka Bridge (Ukrainian: Підйомний міст у Затоці) is a vertical lift road and rail bridge in Ukraine, crossing the Dniester Estuary in Zatoka, Bilhorod-Dnistrovskyi Raion, Odesa Oblast.

The bridge opened in 1955 and carries Highway H33 (the former P70) between Odesa and Bilhorod-Dnistrovskyi, and the railway line from Odesa to Bessarabia. 

The bridge is strategically important as the only direct land connection from Odesa to Romania. During the Russia–Ukraine War the bridge has been repeatedly targeted by Russian missiles. On 10 February 2023 the bridge was hit by a suspected Russian naval drone.

See also
2022 bombing of Odesa
List of bridges in Ukraine
Rail transport in Ukraine

References

 

Bridges in Ukraine
Odesa Oblast
1955 establishments in Ukraine
Bridges completed in 1955